Mor or MOR may refer to:

Names and titles
 Mór, an Irish title for the Chief of the Name
 Mór (given name), a list of people named Mór or Mor
 Mor (surname), a list of people named Mor or Mór
 Mor (honorific), or Mar, in Syriac

Radio and television
 Middle of the road (music) genre
 MOR Entertainment, a new media radio network station in the Philippines, formerly known as MOR Philippines
 MOR Music TV (Cable TV)
 WMOR-TV, Florida, US

Science and technology
 Mid-ocean ridge
 Model order reduction, in mathematical simulations
 M-opioid receptor, in neuroscience
 Mor, a class of morphisms in category theory
 Mor, acidic organic surface in a podzol
 Multipath On-demand Routing in wireless sensor networks

Language
 Mor language (Austronesian)
 Mor language (Papuan)
 mor, the ISO 639-3 code for the Moro language, spoken in the Nuba Mountains of Sudan

Transport
 Ministry of Railways in some Commonwealth states
 MOR, the IATA code for Morristown Regional Airport in the state of Tennessee, US
 MOR, the National Rail code for Mortimer railway station in the county of Berkshire, UK

Other
 Battle of Mór, in the Hungarian Revolution of 1848
 County of Moray, Scotland, Chapman code
 "M.O.R.", a song by Blur
 M.O.R. (album), an album by Alabama 3
 Mór, a town in Fejér County, Hungary
 Mor Furniture, a furniture retailer based in San Diego, California
 Morocco, UNDP code
 Mor River or Mayurakshi River, India
 Museum of the Rockies, Bozeman, Montana, US

See also
 
 
 Middle of the road (disambiguation)
 Moor (disambiguation)
 Moore (disambiguation)
 More (disambiguation)